India Business Report is a weekly business news programme produced by the BBC and shown on BBC World News, presented by Yogita Limaye. The last episode of this programme aired on April 3, 2016.

Presenters

Former presenters
 Karishma Vaswani
 Rajini Vaidyanathan (Relief Presenter)
 Nidhi Dutt
 Delnaaz Irani

Schedule

References

BBC World News shows